Nogometni klub Varaždin, commonly referred to as NK Varaždin or simply Varaždin, is a Croatian professional football club based in Varaždin, that competes in the Croatian Football League, the top tier of Croatian football.

History
The club was founded as FC Varaždin Football School as a phoenix club of NK Varaždin (1931–2015) in 2012 after the latter's suspension; the club was dissolved during the second part of the 2011–12 season due to high financial debt. Legally, the two clubs' track records and honours are kept separate by the Croatian Football Federation, but the 2012 club is a continuation of the older club, which did return to competition in 2013, overlapping with the life of Varaždin ŠN. However, the older club finally declared bankruptcy and dissolved in 2015, leaving the name NK Varaždin available once again.

After steadily progressing through the levels of the Croatian football league system, NK Varaždin competed in the top division for the first time in the 2019–20 season, where they finished in eighth place. However, they were relegated the following season after finishing bottom of the table.

Players

Current squad

Out on loan

Season-by-season record

Key
DNQ = Did not qualify
R1 = First round
R2 = Second round

Notes

1. : Although NK Međimurje finished top of the 2016–17 3. HNL East, they did not apply for promotion, so runners-up NK Varaždin gained promotion to 2. HNL.

References

NK Varazdin
Association football clubs established in 2012
Football clubs in Croatia
Football clubs in Varaždin County
2012 establishments in Croatia